The Atlantic Coast Line is a  Network Rail branch line which includes a community railway service in Cornwall, England. The line runs from the English Channel at Par, to the Atlantic Ocean at Newquay.

Route
The Atlantic Coast Line starts from Par station, in the village and port of Par. The station is on the Cornish Main Line, and trains to Newquay use a curve of almost 180 degrees before joining the route of the Cornwall Minerals Railway (CMR), near the former St Blazey station. Parts of the line were originally built by Treffry as a standard-gauge tramway in the later 1840s to serve Newquay Harbour, and opened from Newquay in 1849. 

It was upgraded for locomotives in 1874 after it had been acquired by the CMR, which extended the railway across Goss Moor from Bugle to St Dennis to complete the route from St Blazey to Newquay. 

Passenger services began between Newquay and Fowey on 20 June 1876. There was no rail connection with the present Par station until 1892 when the broad-gauge main line was 'narrowed' to standard gauge by the Great Western Railway and the connecting curve was built from St Blazey. From St Blazey, the CMR was built along the course of the even earlier Par Canal, originally built to serve the nearby Fowey Consols mine, as far as its terminus at Pontsmill, where the Luxulyan Valley is entered. The thickly wooded terrain and steep granite slopes of this valley surround the fast-flowing River Par, contain a large concentration of early 19th century industrial remains and have been designated a World Heritage Site.

Shortly before reaching Luxulyan station, the line passes under the Treffry Viaduct, an historic railway viaduct and aqueduct that was built in 1844. This both supplied water to the Fowey Consoles mine, and also carried the original line of the Treffry Tramways, a precursor to the CMR.

After Luxulyan, the line passes close to several former and current china clay works, before passing through Bugle and Roche stations.

Between Roche and St Columb Road stations, the line passes through Goss Moor nature reserve, where a low bridge carrying the railway over the A30 road had been the site of accidents when vehicles collided with it. There was a 1986 proposal to abolish the bridge by diverting the line so that trains would have started from St Austell railway station and continued via Burngullow and the old Newquay and Cornwall Junction Railway freight-only line, joining the current route between Roche and St Columb Road at St Dennis Junction. This proposal was later abandoned after a new route for the road was found that avoids the bridge.

After St Columb Road, the line passes through the last intermediate station at Quintrell Downs before reaching the terminus at Newquay.

Mid Cornwall Metro

Government funding of nearly £50,000,000 was announced in January 2023 to create the Mid Cornwall Metro, which will include the Newquay branch. The scheme is calculated to cost £56,800,000, including local contributions, and will also pay for other improvements to Newquay station, such as a larger concourse, ticket machines, platform canopies and a bus interchange. There will also be new signalling at Goonbarrow, Tregoss Moor and Newquay, along with minor changes on the Maritime Line.

Passenger volume
The busiest station on the line is Newquay, where about seven times more passengers arrive and depart than the other stations added together.

Community rail

The Atlantic Coast Line is one of the routes covered by the Devon and Cornwall Rail Partnership, an organisation formed in 1991 to promote railway services in the area. The line is publicised in several ways, including regular timetable and scenic line guides as well as leaflets highlighting attractions on the route.

The Atlantic Coast Line rail ale trail was launched in 2005 to encourage rail travellers to visit pubs near the line. There are three in Newquay, one at St Columb Road, five in and around Par, and two at Quintrell Downs, one each at Roche, Bugle and Luxulyan. With 10 stamps, people can claim a free tour shirt. 

The local passenger service on the line was designated by the Department for Transport as a community rail service in September 2006. This aims to increase the number of passengers and reduce costs and includes the investigation of how to get a better spread of train times during the day, and how to increase train services in the peak summer season. The line itself is not a community railway (unlike the other Cornish branches) because it also carries intercity trains during the summer and freight trains throughout the year.

Focal, a local "friends of the line" group helped to achieve a 75% increase in Par to Newquay passenger services through negotiation and cooperation with the Devon & Cornwall Rail Partnership and Great Western Railway.

Operation
The line is single from St Blazey to Newquay, apart from one passing loop at Goonbarrow Junction, just south of Bugle. It is used by china clay traffic and also passenger trains in the summer, when there is more than one passenger train on the branch. The loop uses semaphore signals.

Passenger services
Most passenger services are operated by Great Western Railway, including all local stopping services which are all operated by Class 150 units. In the summer on Saturdays, local services are replaced by express services to and from London Paddington with operation of Class 802 units. Until 2020, CrossCountry operated on the line on summer weekends, with trains to and from Northern England. All express services do not call at intermediate stations on the branch line, instead running non-stop between Par and Newquay.

In 2007, a daily through service between London and Newquay began running on weekdays in July and August in addition to the two services on summer Saturdays and one service on summer Sundays. This service was also named the Atlantic Coast Express, along with the existing weekend trains to London, which had gained this name in 1987 when InterCity 125 High Speed Trains started serving Newquay.

Freight services
The eastern section of the line - as far as Goonbarrow Junction - sees a large amount of china clay freight traffic operated by DB Cargo UK with a depot operated at St Blazey.

A freight spur connects the line at St Blazey with Par Harbour, passing under the main line from Par to St Austell to reach the harbour. Although originally built as part of the Cornwall Minerals Railway to convey mineral traffic to the harbour, today it is principally used to convey dried china clay from the clay dries at the harbour.

Accidents
On 25 May 1991 the first train of the day from Newquay to London Paddington derailed in the Luxulyan Valley. The train was formed of a High Speed Train. The passengers were transferred to the rear power car which was then uncoupled and run slowly back to Luxulyan railway station where the passengers were transferred to road vehicles to continue their journey.

On 9 March 2005, the 18th wagon of a Goonbarrow to Fowey Docks china clay freight train derailed at the lower end of the valley on Prideaux Viaduct, with the next 14 wagons also derailing. The driver had felt the judder and applied the brakes but the train continued on for a further 115 meters before stopping causing extensive track damage beyond the viaduct, leaving some of the wagons hanging precariously over the edge of the embankment and in danger of sliding into the river. All the wagons stayed coupled together.

On 30 December 2006 heavy rainfall caused a landslide on an embankment near St Blazey, blocking the line. A replacement bus service was run to cover for the passenger service, until the line reopened on 8 January 2007.

On 12 June 2007 a train collided with a car at Chapel level crossing, on the outskirts of Newquay. The crossing is an Automatic Open Level Crossing, where warning lights and a siren give warning of the approach of trains but no barrier is provided. The siren and lights were found to be working. The car driver was injured, but no-one on the train was hurt.

References

External links

Great Scenic Railways in Devon and Cornwall.
The Focal group - working for improved passenger services on the Atlantic Coast Line

Rail transport in Cornwall
Scenic railway lines in Devon and Cornwall
Community railway lines in England
Railway lines in South West England
Newquay
Standard gauge railways in England
Railway lines opened in 1876